The Retail Motor Industry Federation (RMI) represents the interests of motor industry operators in England, Wales, Northern Ireland and the Isle of Man providing sales and services to motorists and businesses.  It does not represent businesses in Scotland, which are represented by the independent Scottish Motor Trade Association.

History
It began from 1914. Motor vehicle retailers broke away from the Society of Motor Manufacturers and Traders (SMMT) to form the Motor Agents Association, which became the Retail Motor Industry Federation in 1990.

Aims and objectives
The aims and objectives of the RMI are
 To support and represent the interests of the companies operating in the sector
 To create conditions for the industry to prosper
 To establish an infrastructure for those buying and operating cars, commercial vehicles and motorcycles.
 To raise standards throughout the industry through quality control schemes and lifetime learning training programs
 To represent the views of the industry to Parliament, Government and the European Union
 To raise the profile of the federated associations through positive public relations strategies
 To promote ecological improvements in the automotive industry

Services 
 Legal advice and assistance
 Industrial relations assistance
 National Joint Council for wage bargaining
 Partnerships with Trading Standards offices
 Independent conciliation and arbitration
 Public relations and marketing
 MOT appeals, representation and fee negotiations
 Business development
 Lobbying in the United Kingdom and in the EU
 Promotion of member businesses to consumers
 Information on government policy, legislation and developments
 Preferential rates on goods and services

Structure
It is based near Great Portland Street tube station, near the junction of the A4201 and A501 (London Inner Ring Road).

Members
Members of the RMI generate an annual turnover of £70 billion and employ 600,000 people directly.

Statistics
Motoring contributes £30 billion annually to the economy in taxes. 75% of all UK households have access to a car, with 30% owning two or more. The 33 million vehicles licensed for use in the UK travel a distance of more than 12.5 million times around the world each year.

Component associations

National Franchised Dealers Association
The RMI National Franchised Dealers Association (NFDA) represents the welfare and interests of franchised dealers within the passenger car and commercial vehicle sectors.

Within the membership structure, there are national and regional committees, representing small to medium dealers, truck dealers, and the largest groups in the industry.

Held quarterly, these meetings give franchised dealers the chance to exchange views and discuss common issues, and enable the NFDA to reflect local, as well as national, issues when lobbying Government departments and representing themselves through the media.

The NFDA is pursuing campaigns to re-establish new car profitability, gain lower list prices, protect members’ investment and enhance dealer viability.

In May 2013, the NFDA took a majority ownership stake in Trusteddealers.co.uk to give the organisation a consumer-facing presence

Motorcycle Retailers Association
The RMI Motorcycle Retailers Association (MRA) is the only organisation that represents exclusively the welfare and interests of retailers of motorcycles, related accessories and services.

An executive committee, comprising members from various regions, enables it to reflect local, as well as national, issues when lobbying Government or representing the industry through the media.

The main aims of the MRA are to provide more influence, better information and stronger support to the motorcycle retail sector to improve profitability, protect members’ investment and to enhance retailer viability.

The MRA has liaison with motorcycle manufacturers and importers, equipment and component suppliers and service providers. It also represents member interests with other organisations such as the Driver and Vehicle Licensing Agency (DVLA), the Department for Transport (DFT), VOSA, the European Commission, Trading Standards, Inland Revenue, media and consumer associations.

It is a member of the National Motorcycle Council and the Motorcycle Theft Action Group.

RMI Petrol
This was formerly the Petrol Retailers Association - PRA, which was formed in 1987. It became RMI Petrol in 2009. It represents independent owners.

RMI Petrol has a range of services to support those making a living through fuel sales and convenience shopping.

RMI Petrol represents members' interests directly with other sectors of the market: the oil companies, Government bodies, forecourt customers and the media.

It is able to advise on such matters as motor fuel costs and margins when no fixed term agreement applies; operating agreements for sites owned by oil companies; supply terms and agreements with shop suppliers; guidance on legal problems, including employment legislation; staff recruitment and training; and equipment purchasing.

National Association of Motor Auctions
The RMI National Association of Motor Auctions (NAMA) represents auction companies of all sizes selling cars, commercial vehicles and off-road vehicles.

Established in 1969, NAMA represents a broad mix of membership from the smaller family businesses to the larger national companies.

NAMA only accepts into membership financially viable companies which can provide evidence of sound and accepted trading practice. The NAMA acts as a pressure group on behalf of the vehicle auction industry in general, and as a supplier of specialist services and advice to individual auction companies. It alerts customers to the benefits of buying or selling through NAMA members who must adhere to NAMA's Code of Practice and Customer Charter.

Independent Garage Association
The RMI Independent Garage Association (IGA) provides UK and European influence, quality standards, support services and  technical information for those involved in the service, repair, sale and MOT testing of motor vehicles.

The IGA provides assistance and guidance to the independent garage sector.
The Retail Motor Industry Federation (RMI) represents its members in Europe through membership of CECRA (the European Council for Motor Trades and Repairs) and CITA (International Motor Vehicle Inspection Committee), ensuring that European law does not have a detrimental effect on independent garages.

As a result of negotiation between the RMI and the Office of Fair Trading (OFT), independent operators have the right to service vehicles within manufacturer and extended warranties; and the RMI continues to campaign on the subject of access to technical information and training relevant to the maintenance of newer vehicles.

National Body Repair Association
The RMI National Body Repair Association (NBRA) policy is formulated by a National Consultative Group consisting of some of the country's leading accident repair specialists.

The aim of the NBRA is to assist members in addressing issues and work for positive change in the industry, to help their businesses survive and thrive.

For example: one of the major ongoing projects is the revision of the Bodyshop Quality Control (QC) Standard. The existing Standard has been a success but, as vehicle technology has moved on, the new Standard needs to be even more attractive to work providers.

The NBRA's objectives are to confront unfair practices; to assist in the creation of conditions that enable industry sectors to prosper; to raise industry standards; to train and ensure adequate human resources; and to provide one voice for all bodyshops through unity with the Vehicle Builders and Repairers Association (VBRA Commercial).

Cherished Numbers Dealers Association
The RMI Cherished Numbers Dealers Association (CNDA) was established in 1971 to represent dealers of personalised and attractive registration numbers, and to protect the interests of their customers.

Personalised and attractive number plates have become a growth industry, with thousands of motorists now displaying registrations which perhaps represent their initials or advertise their business or profession. Others choose a number which bears an amusing message.

Members of the CNDA adhere to a strict code of conduct, and each member is regularly monitored by the Association to ensure that, for instance, transfers are complete within an acceptable time limit.

Although the transfer of a registration number to the new owner can be done by direct application to the Driver and Vehicle Licensing Agency (DVLA), the process of finding a suitable registration, and then ensuring that all legal requirements are complied with, can be complex and time-consuming. A dealer with CNDA membership can handle the process.

References

External links
 RMIF
 CNDA
 IGA
 NAMA
 NFDA
 PRA
 Trusted Dealers

Automotive industry in the United Kingdom
Motor trade associations
Organisations based in the City of Westminster
Retailing organizations
Trade associations based in the United Kingdom